Daniel "Dan" Pascoe (7 July 1900 – 19 May 1971) born in Llanharan, was a Welsh rugby union, and professional rugby league footballer who played in the 1920s. He played representative level rugby union (RU) for Wales, and at club level for Bridgend RFC and Neath RFC, captaining both, as a flanker, i.e. number 6 or 7, and club level rugby league (RL) for Leeds, he died in Leeds

International honours
Dan Pascoe won caps for Wales (RU) while at Bridgend RFC in 1923 against France, and Ireland.

References

External links
Search for "Pascoe" at rugbyleagueproject.org

Statistics at scrum.com
Statistics at wru.co.uk 
The Trinity Boxing Day tradition
(archived by web.archive.org) Trip to Celtic

1900 births
1971 deaths
Bridgend RFC players
Llanharan RFC players
Neath RFC players
Footballers who switched code
Leeds Rhinos players
People from Glamorgan
Rugby league players from Rhondda Cynon Taf
Rugby union flankers
Rugby union players from Llanharan
Wales international rugby union players
Welsh rugby league players
Welsh rugby union players